IPDirector is a suite of content management software developed by the Belgian company EVS Broadcast Equipment. The tool groups several video production management applications, providing ingest control and playout of video feeds from an accompanying video server.

The combination of software and production server allows broadcasters to record, control and play media. Furthermore, ingest control, workflow management, metadata management, 'rough cut' on-the-fly editing and playout control features are also included.

Originally developed for sports production, the XT3 is often found in Outside Broadcasting trucks covering many sporting events such as the FIFA World Cup, IFAF World Cup, MotoGP and Olympic Games. The product can also be found contributing to programmes from broadcasters including NBC, France 2, CCTV, BBC and others.

External links 
 IPDirector on EVS Official WebSite

References 
 4rfv.com
 TVTechnology
 EVS Bring Olympics to Life For Chinese TV from 4rfv
 Olympics Hits New Media from TVTechnology
  Canal 13 Trusts EVS For Covering The 2008 Olympics from BroadcastbuyerTV
 Beijing Olympics: NBC's Multiplatform Push from BroadcastingCable

Broadcast engineering
Video